Javier Guzmán Colin (January 9, 1945 – August 14, 2014) was a Mexican football defender, who played for the Mexico national team between 1970 and 1977. He was part of the Mexico squad for the 1970 World Cup on home soil.

At club level, Guzmán played for Cruz Azul, Pumas,  and Veracruz.

References

External links
 
 

1945 births
2014 deaths
Association football defenders
Mexico international footballers
1970 FIFA World Cup players
Club Universidad Nacional footballers
Cruz Azul footballers
C.D. Veracruz footballers
Footballers from Veracruz
Liga MX players
CONCACAF Championship-winning players
Mexican footballers